Seeing Double is the fourth studio album from S Club. It was the only album to be released under the name "S Club", after the group was rebranded when band member Paul Cattermole left the group in June 2002 after his departure announcement in March. It was used as the main musical influence to the film of the same name released in April 2003. Despite good reviews and reception, the album only managed to reach number 17 on the UK Albums Chart.

Background
After Paul Cattermole's departure, vowing to not disband, the remaining six members stayed together under the name S Club. Despite losing a member of the group, the future remained positive as, although they were very sad to see Cattermole leave the group, they were "delighted" to have extended their contracts meaning they could look forward to new material, a new series of their television show as well as their first feature film. However, media reports of the time were not so optimistic stating that, as neither the Spice Girls nor Take That had survived once they lost a member of their group, it would be difficult for S Club to remain together in an industry which has a "horrible habit of leaving bands in tatters once the first member has left". After only peaking at number-five in the UK charts with "Alive", their first single as a six, S Club's positivism was diminished. Although their progressive musical style was once again furthered with the release of their fourth studio album, Seeing Double, it failed to make an impact on the UK charts, stalling at number-seventeen. S Club's time at the top of the charts was slowly coming to an end, and when Jo O'Meara announced that she had an immobilising back condition which could have left her in a wheelchair, and she was unable to take part in television performances, the group was left devastated.

In April 2003, S Club released their first feature film, Seeing Double, directed by music-video director Nigel Dick, which was to be the last time the group would be seen on-screen together. Unlike its television predecessors, the film moved into the realm of children's fantasy, and saw the group fighting evil scientist Victor Gaghan in his quest to clone the world's pop stars. The film's release was marked by many rumours that the group were about to split, which were quickly denied by the six. However, ten days after the release of their movie, the rumours were confirmed when it was announced live on stage—during their S Club United tour on 21 April 2003 – that, after a final single and greatest hits album, S Club would part ways. The band cited a mutual split, expressing it was simply a time "to move on and face new challenges". Many fans felt "betrayed" and "disappointed" by the breakup, as well as "angry" due to the group denying rumours only two weeks before at the Seeing Double premiere. Many compared the demise of the group to that of fellow pop band Steps, as they too had denied their intentions until the moment before their split, after which they were accused of acting out of "greed and cynicism". Since the split, the members of S Club have commented on how exhausting being in the band was, due to hectic schedules and long filming days.

Track listing

Notes
  Featured in the film Seeing Double
  This song was originally recorded by American pop group, Scene 23.
  This song was recorded before former bandmate Paul Cattermole left the band; his vocals can be heard towards the final chorus of the song.

Charts and certifications

Weekly charts

Year-end charts

Certifications

References

S Club 7 albums
2002 albums
19 Recordings albums
Polydor Records albums